Pejo Kuprešak (born 24 October 1992) is a Croatian football midfielder, currently playing for lower league side Borac Imbriovec.

Club career
Kuprešak played for Croatian top tier-side Slaven Belupo and had a spell at Austrian fourth level-outfit SV Eberau in 2016.

References

External links
Pejo Kuprešak at Sportnet.hr 
 

1992 births
Living people
Footballers from Zagreb
Association football midfielders
Croatian footballers
NK Slaven Belupo players
NK Koprivnica players
NK Zelina players
NK Bjelovar players
Croatian Football League players
First Football League (Croatia) players
Austrian Landesliga players
Croatian expatriate footballers
Expatriate footballers in Austria
Croatian expatriate sportspeople in Austria